László Schäffer (July 19, 1893 – May 1979), was a Hungarian cinematographer. Born in Uzhhorod, Kingdom of Hungary, Austria-Hungary, currently a part of the Ukraine, he worked mostly in Germany in the 1920s.

He moved in his youth to Budapest, where he worked as a photographer. During World War I, he became a cameraman and, after 1920, went to Berlin. With Fritz Arno Wagner, he filmed F. W. Murnau's The Haunted Castle (1921). A further high point in Schäffer's career was the employment as one of several cameramen in Walter Ruttmann's experimental documentary film Berlin: Symphony of a Great City (1927).

After the Nazi Party rose to power in 1933, Schäffer returned to Budapest. He took his place behind the cameras several times, until in 1939 he emigrated to the United States. Establishing himself in Los Angeles, he received no requests for his occupation. He died in Los Angeles in 1979.

Filmography

External links
 László Schäffer at IMDB

1893 births
1979 deaths
People from Uzhhorod
Ukrainian Jews
Hungarian cinematographers
Hungarian emigrants to the United States
Hungarian expatriates in Germany